Below are the squads for the Football at the 2015 Southeast Asian Games - men's tournament, hosted by Singapore, which took place between 29 May and 15 June 2015.

Group A

Singapore 
Head coach:  Aide Iskandar

Indonesia 
Head coach:  Aji Santoso

Myanmar 
Head coach:  Kyi Lwin

Cambodia 
Head coach:  Lee Tae-hoon

Philippines 
Head coach:  Marlon Maro

Group B

Thailand 
Head coach:  Choketawee Promrut

Malaysia 
Head coach:  Ong Kim Swee

Vietnam 
Head coach:  Toshiya Miura

Laos 
Head coach:  Dave Booth

Brunei 
Head coach:  Stephen Ng Heng Seng

Timor-Leste 
Head coach:  Fábio Magrão

References 

Men's team squads